Jet Set Jewel is the sixth studio album by Scottish musician Jack Bruce. The album was recorded in 1978 with the same musicians as his previous album, How's Tricks, but was rejected as uncommercial and not released until Polydor Records' Jack Bruce re-issue campaign in 2003.

Track listing

Personnel
Jack Bruce - vocals, bass, piano, cello
Hughie Burns - guitars, backing vocals
Tony Hymas - keyboards, backing vocals
Simon Phillips - drums, backing vocals
Dick Heckstall-Smith - saxophone on 1 & 3

References

Jack Bruce albums
2003 albums
Polydor Records albums
Albums recorded at Trident Studios